Gusheh-ye Mohammad Malek (also Romanized as Gūsheh-ye Moḩammad Mālek, Goosheh Mohammad Malek, and Gūsheh-ye Moḩammad-e Malek) is a village in Rostaq Rural District, in the Central District of Khomeyn County, Markazi Province, Iran. At the 2006 census, its population was 398, in 101 families.

References 

Populated places in Khomeyn County